Tazmanian Devil is a 2020 American drama film written and directed by Solomon Onita Jr. and starring Abraham Attah.

Cast
Adepero Oduye as Elizabeth Ayodele
Abraham Attah as Dayo Ayodele
Ntare Mwine as Julius Ayodele
Kwesi Boakye as Ike

Production
Principal photography took place in Dallas.  In June 2019, it was confirmed that the film was in post-production.

Release
The film premiered in August 2020 at the American Black Film Festival.  In January 2021, 1091 Pictures acquired distribution rights to the film.

Reception
Alex Saveliev of Film Threat gave the film a 5 out of 10.

Accolade
For his work in the film, Solomon Onita Jr. won the John Singleton Director Award for Best First Feature at the American Black Film Festival.

References

External links
 

American drama films
Films shot in Dallas
Films shot in Texas
1091 Pictures films
2020s English-language films
2020s American films